Annette Tveter (born 1974) is a Norwegian handball player. She played eleven matches for the national handball team in 1997, and participated at the 1997 World Women's Handball Championship in Germany, where the Norwegian team placed second.

References

1974 births
Living people
Norwegian female handball players